Femmes Fatales is an independent professional wrestling promotion based in Montreal, Quebec, Canada.

NCW Femmes Fatales

NCW Femmes Fatales II

NCW Femmes Fatales III

NCW Femmes Fatales IV

NCW Femmes Fatales V

NCW Femmes Fatales VI

NCW Femmes Fatales VII

NCW Femmes Fatales VIII

NCW Femmes Fatales IX

NCW Femmes Fatales X

Femmes Fatales X – part 1

Femmes Fatales X – part 2

NCW Femmes Fatales XI

NCW Femmes Fatales XII

NCW Femmes Fatales XIII

NCW Femmes Fatales XIV

NCW Femmes Fatales XV

NCW Femmes Fatales XVI

NCW Femmes Fatales XVII

NCW Femmes Fatales XVIII

NCW Femmes Fatales XIX

Femmes Fatales 20

Femmes Fatales 21

Femmes Fatales 22

Femmes Fatales 23

See also
Shimmer Volumes
Shine Wrestling events

References

Women's professional wrestling shows
Professional wrestling in Canada